Kannathil Muthamittal (also released internationally under the translated title A Peck on the Cheek) is a 2002 Indian Tamil-language musical war film produced and directed by Mani Ratnam. It was based on a short story, "Amuthavum Avanum" by Sujatha. The film stars R. Madhavan, Simran and P. S. Keerthana with Nandita Das, J. D. Chakravarthy, Prakash Raj and Pasupathy portraying other pivotal characters. The film's score and soundtrack were composed by A. R. Rahman, while Ravi K. Chandran handled the cinematography. Mani Ratnam presents the story of a child of Sri Lankan Tamil parentage adopted by Indian parents, whose desire is to meet her biological mother in the midst of the Sri Lankan Civil War. It was released on 14 February 2002.

The film premiered at the 2002 Toronto International Film Festival, It also received a strong reception when screened at the San Francisco International Film Festival in 2003.The film received high critical acclaim upon release and went on to win six National Film Awards, three Filmfare Awards South, six Cinema Express Awards, seven Tamil Nadu State Film Awards and Best Film awards at six international film festivals.

Plot
In Mankulam, a small Tamil village in Sri Lanka, M. D. Shyama marries Dileepan and becomes pregnant. Amidst the backdrop of the civil war, Dileepan fights against the government with other men in the village as part of the separatist Liberation Tigers of Tamil Eelam (LTTE). While romancing in the forest, the couple hears Sri Lankan Army troops approaching. Dileepan makes Shyama flee while he remains in the forest. Afterwards, the villagers begin fleeing to India, but Shyama is reluctant to join as she still hopes her husband will come for her. Her relatives convince her to go for her unborn child's sake, and they board a rickety boat, journeying through rough waters. An older man says that he has seen Dileepan with bullet wounds in the forest. Shyama wants the boat to turn around but it is too late. After arriving in Rameswaram, Shyama gives birth to a baby girl during refugee processing. However, she leaves behind the baby in order to return to Sri Lanka, hoping that her husband is alive and wishing to continue in his footsteps.

Nine years later in Madras, a young girl, Amudha lives a happy life with her father, the writer Thiruchelvan (better known by his pen name Indira), her mother, a newscaster and the "real" Indira, and her two younger brothers, Vinay and Akhil. Amudha is close to her father while being more distant from her mother. On Amudha's ninth birthday, Thiruchelvan reveals to Amudha that she was adopted and her younger brothers are their biological children. Amudha is very disturbed after hearing the news and begins distancing herself from everyone else. Indira's father criticizes their decision, but Thiruchelvan and Indira are certain they have done the right move. Amudha asks her parents about her adoption. Nine years earlier in Rameswaram, Thiruchelvan, then a budding writer, often travels to a refugee camp and writes stories inspired by the people there. During one visit, Thiruchelvan sees a newborn baby girl and writes a short story about her. Indira is his neighbour, and has always been interested in him. Thiruchelvan wants to adopt the girl, but is not allowed to as a single man. He marries Indira and adopts the baby girl, naming her "Amudha" at Indira's suggestion. A few years later, Indira gives birth to Vinay and Akhil.

Still dissatisfied, Amudha requests to meet her biological mother despite Indira's insistence that she can't be found. Amudha secretly goes to Rameshwaram with her cousin and finds her records. Shocked at her stubbornness, her family rushes there. Thiruchelvan gives in and agrees to take Amudha to Sri Lanka to find her birth mother. Leaving the two boys under the care of Indira's father, the trio travel to Sri Lanka and meet Dr. Harold Wickramasinghe, a Sinhalese friend of Thiruchelvan who guides them. Amudha's increasingly rude and impatient behavior towards Indira strains their relationship. During their stay, they observe the difficulties and violence that the civil war has brought. While walking in the jungle, Thiruchelvan and Wickramasinghe are captured by a group of LTTE cadres. Thiruchelvan immediately recites Tamil poetry and is identified as Indira by Pasupathy, the group's leader. Thiruchelvan explains his motives of coming to the country, mentioning the only evidence that he has regarding Amudha's birth mother is that her name is Shyama. Pasupathy arranges a meeting and says he will bring Shyama to the designated spot. It turns out that Shyama is Pasupathy's sister and a fellow LTTE cadre living in hiding.

The next day, Wickramasinghe, Amudha, Indira, and Thiruchelvan wait in a park to meet Shyama, but a battle breaks out there as the Sri Lankan army tries to destroy a nearby LTTE base. During their escape, Indira gets shot in her arm. After escaping and getting medical treatment, Amudha apologizes to Indira for her behavior and requests they return to India. The next day, the family leaves for the airport but Indira unexpectedly asks them to revisit the park. Shyama arrives just in time; after an emotional reunion, Amudha gives Shyama a photo album and asks her a series of questions which she only partially answers. As the meeting comes to an end, Amudha begs Shyama to come to Madras with her but Shyama tearfully refuses, saying that she has work to do in Sri Lanka and they can only meet again when the country is at peace. Thiruchelvan, Amudha, and Indira hug each other as Shyama leaves, and a teary-eyed Amudha kisses her parents.

Cast

 R. Madhavan as Thiruchelvan, also known by the pen-name Indira (his wife's name) 
 Simran as Indira Thiruchelvan, Thiruchelvan's wife (voice-over by Deepa Venkat) 
 P. S. Keerthana as T. Amudha, the adopted daughter of Thiruchelvan and Indira 
 Nandita Das as M. D. Shyama, Amudha's biological mother (voice-over by Sukanya) 
 Prakash Raj as Dr. Harold Wickramasinghe
 Chakravarthy as Dileepan, Amudha's biological father.
 Delhi Kumar as D. Ganesan, Indira's father
 Pasupathy as Pasupathy, Shyama's brother
 Bala Singh as Devanathan
 M. S. Bhaskar as Shankaralingam
 Sashikumar as Sashi, a suicide bomber
 Master Suraj as Vinayan, son of Thiruchelvan and Indira
 Master Kethan as Akhilan, son of Thiruchelvan and Indira
 Eswari Rao as another Shyama
 Kukku Parameshwaram as Sundari
 Pondy Ravi as Dhanraj
 Mu Ramaswamy as Sundaralingam
 Kamala Krishnaswamy as Kamala, Thiruchelvan's elder sister 
 Siddharth as bus passenger (uncredited role)
 Shefali Chowdhury as a refugee (uncredited role)

Production
Like other Mani Ratnam projects, the film began production with very little official publicity in early 2001 with the media covering the project as either Manjal Kudai (Yellow Umbrella) or Kudaigal (Umbrellas). The film was reported of a trilogy of films based on love and peace in the backdrop of war after Roja (1992), Bombay (1995) and Dil Se (1998). The film was originally conceived as a taut racy thriller that centres on a script based on a female leader of a guerilla group  – with Mani Ratnam later choosing to base the film on human relationships with the backdrop of the Sri Lankan Civil War. R. Madhavan was signed up to play a leading role in the film, with the venture becoming his third straight Mani Ratnam project after Alaipayuthey and the Mani Ratnam production, Dumm Dumm Dumm. For the role of Indira, Mani Ratnam considered casting Jyothika, Soundarya or relative newcomer Bhumika Chawla, before finalising Simran to portray the character. Madhavan and Simran thus shot for two films simultaneously together, as they had also been cast in K. Balachandar's Paarthale Paravasam as a married couple. Nandita Das was also hired for the film, making her debut in Tamil films, and in a later interview mentioned that the team shot for nearly thirteen hours a day. P. S. Keerthana, the second daughter of actors Parthiban and Seetha, was cast the child artiste in the film, while Prakash Raj was also hired to play a Sinhalese character. Mani Ratnam approached actor Vikram to make a special appearance as Keerthana's biological father in the film, but his refusal meant that J. D. Chakravarthy was later handed the role.

The title of the film was finally announced as Kannathil Muthammittal (If the cheek is kissed) in July 2001, after a famous phrase from a poem written by Subramanya Bharathi. The shoot began in Chennai with a ten-day schedule in the Besant Nagar area. Parts of the film shown to be Colombo in the film were shot in Puducherry. Further schedules were carried out in the forests of Kerala to depict the base of the LTTE in northern Sri Lanka. As most of the cast were non-native Tamil speakers, dubbing artistes were used with actresses Sukanya and Deepa Venkat lending their voices for Nandita Das and Simran respectively. Furthermore, Mounika lent her voice for Easwari Rao's character, while Thalaivasal Vijay spoke lines for Chakravarthy.

Music

The soundtrack featuring six songs was released on 12 January 2002 by the label Tips Music. This film marked the debut of playback singer Chinmayi into the film industry at the age of 15. The score and soundtrack fetched A. R. Rahman his fourth National Film Award for Best Music Direction. Lyricist Vairamuthu too won the National Film Award for Best Lyrics, for the song "Kannathil Muthamittal".

Release
The film opened to positive reviews from critics. Gauthaman Baskaran of The Hindu Frontline wrote the film is "certainly a must for those who still believe in meaningful cinema", while praising Mani Ratnam's "grip on the medium".

Accolades 

This is a list of awards and nominations received by the 2002 Indian Tamil-language film Kannathil Muthamittal.
The film was highly appreciated upon its release and went on to win several awards and nominations at different award ceremonies the following year. It also had a highly acclaimed soundtrack which got A. R. Rahman his fourth National Film Award for Best Music Direction for the second consecutive time after Lagaan for both his songs and background score. The film holds a record of six National Film Awards wins which is the highest by any Tamil Film tied with Aadukalam and also being the highest for the year 2002. The film has won a total of 40 awards since its release.

Indian awards

International awards

Notes

References

External links
 
 
 Accolades for Kannathil Muthamittal at the Internet Movie Database

2002 films
2000s musical drama films
Films directed by Mani Ratnam
Films set in Chennai
Films about adoption
Films shot in Sri Lanka
Films about the Sri Lankan Civil War
Films about terrorism in India
Films shot in Ooty
2000s Tamil-language films
Films scored by A. R. Rahman
Films set in Sri Lanka
Films shot in Chalakudy
Films whose editor won the Best Film Editing National Award
Films that won the Best Audiography National Film Award
Best Tamil Feature Film National Film Award winners
2002 drama films
Films shot in Thrissur